Senator Blood may refer to:

Carol Blood (born 1961), Nebraska State Senate
Isaiah Blood (1810–1870), New York State Senate
Robert O. Blood (1887–1975), New Hampshire State Senate